Pseudokineococcus basanitobsidens is a Gram-positive, aerobic and non-spore-forming bacterium from the genus of Pseudokineococcus which has been isolated from a volcanic rock from Seobjikoj in Korea.

References

External links
Type strain of Pseudokineococcus basanitobsidens at BacDive -  the Bacterial Diversity Metadatabase

Bacteria described in 2017
Actinomycetia